Mycoredoxin (Mrx1, MrxI) is an enzyme with systematic name arseno-mycothiol:mycoredoxin oxidoreductase. This enzyme catalyses the following chemical reaction

 arseno-mycothiol + mycoredoxin  arsenite + mycothiol-mycoredoxin disulfide

Reduction of arsenate is part of a defense mechanism of the cell against toxic arsenate.

References

External links 
 

EC 1.20.4